Roy Kabina Essandoh (born 17 February 1976) is a Northern Ireland former professional footballer.

He is best remembered for his last gasp FA Cup quarter final winner while with Wycombe Wanderers.

Early life 
Born in Belfast, Essandoh moved with his family to Ghana (his father Richard's birthplace) when he was seven months old. When he was eight, the family moved back to Northern Ireland, where he attended school.

Career 
Essandoh began his career at Motherwell when he was 18 years of age. Following a short spell at East Fife, he moved to Finland to play for VPS Vaasa until the turn of the new millennium when he returned to the United Kingdom.

Upon his return, and after just a couple of games for Conference National side Rushden & Diamonds, followed the highlight of his career when somewhat extraordinarily Essandoh's agent responded to an appeal by Wycombe Wanderers manager Lawrie Sanchez looking for a fit, non-cup-tied striker the week before their FA Cup quarter-final match with Leicester City, which had been posted on the club's website and spotted by a journalist who published the story on the BBC's television text service Ceefax. Offered a two-week contract, Essandoh came on as a late substitute at Leicester's Filbert Street ground and scored a last-minute winning header to secure third-tier Wycombe a first-ever FA Cup semi-final place, against Liverpool.

Essandoh's goal in the FA Cup quarter-final against Leicester City was voted the 76th best FA Cup moment ever in Andy Gray's FA Cup Madness. It was however the only goal he scored for Wycombe, and he was released at the end of his first season in English football.

After short stays at Barnet (where he scored against Yeovil in the league and Bournemouth in the Football League Trophy), Cambridge City, Grays Athletic, Bishop's Stortford, Billericay Town, Gravesend & Northfleet and Kettering Town, Essandoh returned to Bishop's Stortford for an extended spell starting in 2005. In August 2010, Essandoh signed for St Neots Town, before signing for Braintree Town on 31 March 2011.

On 6 July 2014 he played for Hemingford Veterans FC v Cambridge in a 5–2 win.

References

External links
 
 Interview with Essandoh's mother
 Roy Essandoh at NonLeagueDaily

1976 births
Living people
Association footballers from Northern Ireland
Expatriate association footballers from Northern Ireland
Cumbernauld United F.C. players
Motherwell F.C. players
East Fife F.C. players
Rushden & Diamonds F.C. players
Wycombe Wanderers F.C. players
Barnet F.C. players
Cambridge City F.C. players
Bishop's Stortford F.C. players
Bury Town F.C. players
Grays Athletic F.C. players
Ebbsfleet United F.C. players
Kettering Town F.C. players
Vaasan Palloseura players
Veikkausliiga players
Billericay Town F.C. players
Expatriate footballers in Finland
Isthmian League players
Scottish Football League players
English Football League players
Association football forwards